This is a list of major bridges in Brisbane, Queensland, Australia:

Airport Flyover, Brisbane
Albert Bridge, Brisbane
Captain Cook Bridge, Brisbane
Centenary Bridge
Charlie Earp Bridge
Eleanor Schonell Bridge
Go Between Bridge
Goodwill Bridge
Hornibrook Bridge
Houghton Highway
Indooroopilly Railway Bridge
Jack Pesch Bridge
Kurilpa Bridge
Merivale Bridge
Neville Bonner Bridge under construction
Sir Leo Hielscher Bridges
Story Bridge
Ted Smout Memorial Bridge
Victoria Bridge, Brisbane
Walter Taylor Bridge
William Jolly Bridge

See also 
 Bridges over the Brisbane River
 Historic bridges of New South Wales
 List of bridges in Sydney
 List of bridges in Melbourne
 List of bridges in Perth, Western Australia
 List of bridges in Hobart
 List of crossings of the Murray River
 Crossings of the Yarra River

Brisbane
Brisbane
Lists of buildings and structures in Brisbane
Queensland transport-related lists